Scott Nelson Lockwood (born March 23, 1968) is a former professional American football running back who played two seasons with the New England Patriots of the National Football League (NFL) and three seasons in the Italian Football League in Europe. 

He was drafted by Patriots in the eighth round of the 1992 NFL Draft. He played college football at the University of Southern California and attended Fairview High School in Boulder, Colorado. Lockwood was also a member of the Detroit Lions. He played in 6 games for the Patriots from 1992 to 1993, rushing 35 times for 162 yards. He also returned 11 kicks for 233 yards. He rushed for a career-high 123 yards on December 27, 1992, against the Miami Dolphins.

Lockwood played running back for the Bergamo Lions in the Italian Football League in 1994-1996 seasons and was one of top players in the league.
He then had a stint coaching in Italy with Sam Pagano who served as the Lions head coach for several seasons.

College 

Lockwood was a key player for the USC Trojans in 1987, 1988, 1990, 1991. He rushed for 1313 yards and 13 touchdowns and had 50 receptions for 387 yards and a touchdown. He was also a main returner of punts and kickoffs and was selected in the 1992 NFL draft by the New England Patriots despite an injury plagued senior season.

References

External links
Just Sports Stats
College stats
Where are they now? - Scott Lockwood
[https://www.buffzone.com/2020/04/04/covid-19-deaths-in-italy-heartbreaking-for-former-cu-buffs/
[https://www.sports-reference.com/cfb/players/scott-lockwood-1.html

Living people
1968 births
Players of American football from Los Angeles
American football running backs
USC Trojans football players
New England Patriots players
Detroit Lions players
American expatriate sportspeople in Italy
American expatriate players of American football